The River City Rumblers were a minor league professional baseball franchise based in Huntington, West Virginia during the 1995 season.  The Rumblers replaced the Huntington Cubs in the Appalachian League after the Cubs moved their rookie league affiliation to Florida and was operated as a co-op club with nine organization contributing players to the roster.

The Rumblers were managed by Phillip Wellman and finished last at 22-45 in the league.  Their total attendance in 1995 of 20,631 was second worst in the 10-team Appalachian League.  The franchise folded after the 1995 season after no major league franchise was willing to affiliate with the team.

External links
Baseball Reference

Defunct Appalachian League teams
Sports in Huntington, West Virginia
Professional baseball teams in West Virginia
1995 establishments in West Virginia
1995 disestablishments in West Virginia
Baseball teams established in 1995
Baseball teams disestablished in 1995
Defunct baseball teams in West Virginia